Neftegorsk may refer to:
Neftegorsk, Krasnodar Krai, an urban-type settlement in Krasnodar Krai, Russia
Neftegorsk, Sakhalin Oblast, a former urban-type settlement in Sakhalin Oblast, Russia, destroyed in an earthquake in 1995
Neftegorsk, Samara Oblast, a town in Samara Oblast, Russia